ARC Antioquia was the name ship of her class of two destroyers built during the 1930s for the Armada Nacional República de Colombia. Originally ordered by the Portuguese Navy, they were purchased by Colombia while still under construction. Antioquia was discarded in 1960 and subsequently scrapped.

Design and description

The Antioquias were powered by two Parsons-Curtis geared steam turbines, each driving one propeller shaft using steam provided by three Yarrow boilers.

Armament was similar to contemporary Royal Navy destroyers, with a gun armament of four 4.7 in (120 mm) Vickers-Armstrong Mk G guns, and three 2-pounder Mk VIII anti-aircraft guns. Two quadruple banks of 21-inch (533 mm) torpedo tubes were carried, while two depth charge throwers and 12 depth charges constituted the ships' anti-submarine armament. Up to 20 mines could be carried. The ships' complement consisted of 147 officers and men.

Construction and career
The design of the six ships of the Douro class was by the British company Yarrow Shipbuilders, based on that of the Royal Navy's prototype destroyer . Two were built at Yarrow's shipyard in Clydebank, Scotland, and the remaining four in Lisbon with Yarrow machinery.

Douro was purchased before her completion by the Armada Nacional República de Colombia in 1933 in response to the Colombia–Peru War. She was renamed for Colombia's Antioquia Department, which had contributed the funds for her acquisition. A sister ship, NRP Tejo, was purchased at the same time and renamed ARC Caldas.

In 1936 Antioquia was involved in what could have been a serious international incident. On the occasion of the death of the British King, George V, the Bermuda Militia Artillery (BMA), a part-time reserve of the Royal Regiment of Artillery, had been instructed to fire a memorial salute from a 4.7 inch gun at St. David's Battery, in the British colony of Bermuda. This salute was to consist of seventy blank rounds, one for each year of the king's life, fired at one-minute intervals.

Because of the difficulty of storing ammunition in Bermuda's humid climate, there proved to be only twenty-three blank rounds in stock, and the remainder used were all headed ammunition. As the firing was to commence at 08:00 (on 21 January), and it was thought unlikely any vessels would be in the danger area, it was decided to proceed with the salute, ensuring the guns were elevated for maximum range, out to sea. The firing began at 07:00, and was over seventy minutes later.

What the BMA gunners were unaware of, however, was that Antioquia was at the receiving end of their barrage. Antioquia was under the command of a retired Royal Naval officer (part of the British Naval Mission to Colombia), and was arriving at Bermuda to undergo repairs at the Royal Naval Dockyard. Although the ship's crewmembers were alarmed to find themselves under fire, the ship fortunately was not hit.

ARC Antioquia and ARC Caldas were both refitted in the United States, at Mobile, Alabama, in 1954, when three  guns were fitted, two forward and one aft. This had the effect of shifting their centres-of-gravity, resulting in poor handling in foul weather, which also over-stressed the hulls.

The current ARC Antioquia is an  missile-armed frigate.

Citations

Sources
 
 

 

Destroyers of the Colombian Navy
Antioquia-class destroyers
History of Bermuda
Douro-class destroyers
1933 ships
Ships built in Portugal